The 2022 Men's EuroHockey Club Trophy I was the 45th edition of Europe's secondary men's club field hockey tournament organized by the European Hockey Federation and the second edition since it was renamed from the EuroHockey Club Trophy to the EuroHockey Club Trophy I. It was held in Paris, France, from 15 to 18 April 2022.

Qualified teams
The following eight teams with the following seeding were qualified for the tournament. Dinamo Elektrostal and Stroitel Brest were excluded due to the Russian invasion of Ukraine. Grunwald Poznań and OKS Vinnitsa withdrew before the tournament.
 Dinamo Elektrostal
 Montrouge
 Rotweiss Wettingen
 Stroitel Brest
 OKS Vinnitsa
 Grunwald Poznań
 Bohemians Prague
 Lousada

Preliminary round

Pool A

Classification round

Third place game

Final

Final standings
 Montrouge
 Rotweiss Wettingen
 Lousada
 Bohemians Prague

See also
2022 Men's Euro Hockey League
2022 Men's EuroHockey Club Trophy II
2022 Women's EuroHockey Club Trophy

References

Men's EuroHockey Club Trophy I
Club Trophy I
International field hockey competitions hosted by France
International sports competitions hosted by Paris
2020s in Paris
EuroHockey Club Trophy I
EuroHockey Club Trophy I
EuroHockey Club Trophy I